Mismates is a 1926 silent film starring Doris Kenyon and Warner Baxter.  The movie was written by Sada Cowan from a play by Myron C. Fagan and directed by Charles Brabin. This film is now lost.

Cast (in credits order)
Doris Kenyon as Judy Winslow
Warner Baxter as Ted Carroll
May Allison as Belle
Philo McCullough as Jim Winslow
Charles Murray	as Black
Maude Turner Gordon as Mrs. Winslow
John Kolb as Watson
Julius Briner as The Cook
Cyril Ring as Helwig
Nancy Kelly as Jimsy (*Nancy Kelly, a child actress at this time)

References

External links 
 
allmovie/synopsis

1926 films
American films based on plays
American silent feature films
1926 drama films
Silent American drama films
Lost American films
American black-and-white films
Lost drama films
1926 lost films
Films directed by Charles Brabin
1920s American films